Statistics of DPR Korea Football League in the 1993 season.

Overview
April 25 SC won the championship.

References
RSSSF

DPR Korea Football League seasons
1
Korea
Korea